Marco Rizi (born September 15, 1968 in Montreal, Quebec) is a former Canadian professional soccer player.  Rizi played in the American Professional Soccer League, professional indoor soccer, and briefly in Major League Soccer.

Club career
Rizi grew up in Montreal, graduating from Laurier Macdonald High School in 1985.  He began his professional career in 1988 with Montreal Supra in the Canadian Soccer League. In 1990, after having spent most of September and the first half of October on trial with the Cleveland Crunch of the Major Indoor Soccer League, Rizi signed with the team on October 13, 1990.  He was a regular with the Crunch during the 1990–1991 season and on July 31, 1991, the San Diego Sockers made him a contract offer.  The Crunch met the offer a week later and Rizi remained in Cleveland for the 1991–1992 season.  He lost eight games at the start of the season with a groin injury, then underwent arthroscopic surgery in February 1992 for torn cartilage in his left knee.  He lost several weeks before returning to play only to break a bone in his left foot at the start of the playoffs.  He returned to the Supra for the 1992 CSL season, but the team and the league collapsed at the end of the season.

In February 1993, Rizi signed with the Detroit Rockers of the National Professional Soccer League.  On April 3, 1993, he joined the Montreal Impact of the American Professional Soccer League.  He would play both the 1993 and 1994 APSL seasons in Montreal, scoring once in 24 games in 1993 and twice in 1994.  In 1994, the Impact won the APSL championship. In the fall of 1993, he signed with the Canton Invaders. On February 27, 1994, the Chicago Power acquired Rizi from the Invaders in exchange for "future considerations".  Rizi returned to the Invaders for the start of the 1994–1995 NPSL season.

On February 16, 1995, he moved to the Buffalo Blizzard.  In May 1995, he signed with the Seattle Sounders  of the A-League.  Rizi and his teammates would win the league championship.  He returned to the Blizzard for the 1995–1996 NPSL season, but broke his leg in the season opener and lost the remainder of the season.  In 1996, he played for the Rochester Rhinos in the A-League.  On May 3, 1997, he signed with the New York / New Jersey MetroStars, coming on to play 33 minutes as a substitute in one game.  Rizi retired in 1998.  On October 25, 2000, Rizi signed with the Houston Hotshots of the World Indoor Soccer League.  In October 2001, he signed with the Cleveland Crunch.

International career
He had played for the National Youth side under Tony Taylor in the 1980s and Rizi played two games at the 1987 Pan American Games. At the time, he was a member of the Canada U-20 men's national soccer team with which he earned 11 caps, including two at the 1987 FIFA World Youth Championship.

He made his senior debut for Canada in a September 1992 friendly match against the USA and went on to earn a total of 12 caps, scoring no goals. He has represented Canada in 2 FIFA World Cup qualification matches. His final international was an August 1995 Caribana Cup match against Jamaica.

Rizi is currently a soccer coach with Ohio Premier

References

External links
 
 
 MISL stats
 Stats

1968 births
Living people
Canadian people of Italian descent
Soccer players from Montreal
Canadian soccer players
Canada men's international soccer players
Canadian expatriate soccer players
Canadian expatriate sportspeople in the United States
Expatriate soccer players in the United States
Footballers at the 1987 Pan American Games
Pan American Games competitors for Canada
Montreal Supra players
Cleveland Crunch (original MISL) players
Detroit Rockers players
Montreal Impact (1992–2011) players
Canton Invaders players
Chicago Power (NPSL) players
Seattle Sounders (1994–2008) players
Buffalo Blizzard players
Rochester New York FC players
New York Red Bulls players
Houston Hotshots players
Cleveland Crunch (2001–2002 MISL) players
Canadian Soccer League (1987–1992) players
Major Indoor Soccer League (1978–1992) players
National Professional Soccer League (1984–2001) players
American Professional Soccer League players
Major League Soccer players
World Indoor Soccer League players
Major Indoor Soccer League (2001–2008) players
Canada men's youth international soccer players
Association football defenders